Fengping is a town in Mangshi, Yunnan, China. The town shares a border with Santaishan Township, Xuangang Township and Mangshi Town to the west and north, Longling County and Zhongshan Township to the east, and Mengga Town to the south.

Administrative division
As of December 2015, the town is divided into eleven villages and one community: 
 Xingqiao Community
 Fengping
 Namu
 Padi
 Mangbie
 Mangsai
 Fapa
 Lazhang
 Zheyan
 Mangli
 Shangdong
 Pinghe

History
After the founding of the Communist State in 1953, Fengping District was set up. In May 1954 it was renamed "Meng Community". In February 1957, the Meng Community and Yun Community merged into one named "Mangshiba District". On March 23, 1969, it was renamed "Dongfeng People's Commune". In March 1984, it reverted to its former name of "Fengping District". In December 1987, its name was changed to "Fengping Township". On August 20, 1998, it was upgraded to a town. In November 2005, the former Fapa Town was merged into Fengping Town.

Geography

The Mangshi River, Guolang River and Guangsha River flow through the town.

There are a number of lakes and reservoirs in the town which include Kongque Lake, Mengbanhe Reservoir, Mangbie Reservoir, Yunmen Reservoir, Namu Reservoir, and Qingtanghe Reservoir.

Economy
The local economy is primarily based upon agriculture and animal husbandry. Coffee, lemon, turmeric, bamboo, citrus and sugarcane are the main cash crops.

Education
The town has two public schools: Fengping School and Nongxiang School.

Attraction
Fengping Pagoda is a major attraction, it was originally built in 1728 during the region of Yongzheng Emperor of the Qing dynasty (1644–1911).

Transport
Dehong Mangshi Airport serves the town.

The National Highway G320 passes across the town.

The town is connected to two roads: Luying Road and Fengfa Road.

References

Divisions of Mangshi